The Iraqi presidential election of 2022 was held on 13 October 2022 to elect by indirect suffrage the President of Iraq for a four-year term. The position is largely ceremonial, with Iraq being a parliamentary system. Outgoing President Barham Salih was eligible for re-election, but was beaten in the second round by Abdul Latif Rashid.

Process 
Initially scheduled for February 7, 2022, the vote was postponed due to the boycott of parliamentary sessions by the majority of deputies. They protested against the decision of the Supreme Court to rule out the candidacy of Hoshyar Zebari, who is supported by the main winning parties of the elections of October 2021.

Rescheduled to 26 March 2022, it was postponed again due to the quorum also not being met. On 30 March, it was postponed for a third time due to the quorum not being met once again. Then scheduled to be held on 6 April 2022, it failed due to the quorum not being met. Finally, the election was held on 13 October with quorum met.

Results

Notes

References

2022 in Iraq
Presidential elections in Iraq
2022 elections in Asia